The discography of the alternative rock band The Rentals consists of four studio albums, one soundtrack album, one compilation album, one benefit album, five extended plays and 24 singles.

Albums

Studio albums

Soundtrack albums

Compilation albums

Benefit albums

EPs

Singles

Demo albums
For The Ladies (Early Rentals Session)
Excellent Stocking Stuffer (demos and rough mixes)
 Little Russel Street (Seven More Minutes rough mixes and demos)

References 

Alternative rock discographies